The Kalu Ganga Dam is a large gravity dam, and the second vital component of the larger and more complex Moragahakanda — Kalu Ganga Project, currently under construction across the Kalu Ganga at Pallegama, in the Matale District of Sri Lanka. This Kalu Ganga is a tributary of Amban Ganga which is itself a tributary of the Mahaweli River the longest river in Sri Lanka. This shall not be confused with Kalu Ganga. The maiden waters of the dam was released in July 2018. 

The larger combined project involves the construction of the Kalu Ganga Dam and Reservoir, along with the separate Moragahakanda Dam and Reservoir, for irrigation and power generation purposes.

Since original document prepared in ... - The Parliament of Sri Lankaref name=SMEC></ref>

Funding 

The funding from OPEC will carry an interest rate of 3.2%, and a service charge of 1% on the principle amount withdrawn and outstanding.

Dam and reservoir 

To support the new Kalu Ganga Reservoir created by the dam, two additional saddle dams will also be created to contain the reservoir.

In addition to using the reservoir's water for irrigation, a percentage of it would be consistently transferred via tunnel to the Moragahakanda Reservoir for further irrigation uses and hydroelectricity generation.

Environmental and Social Impact of the Dam Construction
A large area of forest east of Pallegama has been cleared for the construction of the dam and even more so for the construction of a new residential and agricultural colony east of the dam. The forest area cleared is adjoining Wasgamuwa National Park and linked the forests on the eastern side of Knuckles Mountain Range with the Wasgamuwa National Park. Elephants and other wildlife used to inhabit this area and used it as corridor. There are attempts to minimize environmental impact by reforesting catchment areas, and declaration of elephant corridors to Wasgamuwa, Girithale, Mineriya national parks.

Several old villages, including Pallegama and Rambukoluwa, have to be abandoned and all the residents have to relocate to the new colony, about 5 to 10 kilometers northeast of Pallegama. Each family is compensated with two acres of land, 1.5 acres of paddy land and half an acre in the residential area to construct a new house.

See also 

 List of dams and reservoirs in Sri Lanka

References 

Dams in Sri Lanka
Gravity dams
Buildings and structures in Matale District
Dams completed in 2018
2018 establishments in Sri Lanka